Joana Foster (15 February 1946 – 5 November 2016) was a Ghanaian-British activist and lawyer.

Early life
Joana was born in Ghana and attended Achimota School.

Education
Joana was educated in Ghana and United Kingdom. She read law at Leeds University then went on to qualify as a lawyer, and later lectured in various Colleges.

Career
Joana was a lawyer by profession.

Awards and recognition
Joana co founded the African Women's Development Fund along with  Bisi Adeleye-Fayemi and Hilda M. Tadria in 2000.

References

1946 births
Ghanaian activists
Ghanaian feminists
Ghanaian women's rights activists
2016 deaths